King's Garden may refer to:

 King's Garden (biblical place)
 Al-Bustan (East Jerusalem)
 King's Garden (Odense), Denmark
 King's Garden, Fort Ticonderoga, New York, US 
 Ġnien is-Sultan (Maltese: King's Garden), Valletta, Malta
 Königsgarten, in Paradeplatz, Königsberg, Germany
 Kungsträdgården (King's Garden), Stockholm, Sweden
 Rosenborg Castle Gardens (Danish: Kongens Have, literally The King's Garden), Copenhagen, Denmark

See also
 Danish King's Garden, a park in Tallinn Old Town, Estonia
 King's Schools, Seattle, Washington, US; originally named King's Garden
 King's Stairs Gardens, a park in Bermondsey, London
 Royal Gardens (disambiguation)